Norbert Steixner was an Austrian luger who competed in the early 1950s. He won a bronze medal in the men's doubles event at the 1951 European luge championships in Igls, Austria.

References
List of European luge champions 

Austrian male lugers
Year of birth missing
Year of death missing